Ali bin Ahmed Al Kuwari is a Qatari politician who has served as Minister of Finance since October 2021. Previously he served as Minister of Commerce and Industry from November 2018 to October 2021 and acting Minister of Finance from May to October 2021.

Education 
Al Kuwari holds a Bachelor of Mathematics and Computer Science from Eastern Washington University and a Master of Science in Management Information Systems from the Seattle Pacific University.

Career 
In 1988, Al Kuwari joined Qatar National Bank. He was Executive General Manager and Group Chief Business Officer of QNB. On 9 July 2013, Al Kuwari became the CEO of QNB Group. He chairs the MasterCard Middle East and North Africa Advisory Board. He is also chairman of QNB Capital and of QNB Privée Suisse in Switzerland as well as vice chairman of Qatar Exchange.

References 

Living people
Finance ministers of Qatar
Government ministers of Qatar
Seattle Pacific University alumni
21st-century Qatari politicians
Eastern Washington University alumni
Year of birth missing (living people)